Bad Reputation is a 2007 American slasher film written and directed by Jim Hemphill.

Plot 

Michelle Rosen, an introverted and insecure high school student, is approached at lunch by popular jock Aaron Cussler, who invites Michelle to a party he is throwing. Charmed by Aaron, Michelle goes to the gathering, where she makes out with Aaron (to the annoyance of Aaron's occasional girlfriend Debbie) and befriends another student named Wendy, a formerly overweight outcast who is now a member of Debbie and Aaron's clique. As the night progresses, Aaron and two of his friends, Steve (Wendy's boyfriend) and Jake, get Michelle drunk, and slip her a roofie. Aaron and Jake then rape Michelle (at one point violating her with a bottle) in a bedroom while Steve, who had grown reluctant, restrains her. Afterward, the boys' girlfriends find the unconscious Michelle, and convinced by Aaron that Michelle was the aggressor, Debbie uses packing tape to tie Michelle to a tree in the backyard, after writing "Slut" and "Ho" on her. The only one who tries to aid Michelle is Wendy, but she is made to back off by Jake's girlfriend Heather, under threat of being made a pariah. Michelle eventually frees herself and goes home, where she engenders no sympathy from her emotionally abusive mother.

Rumors of Michelle's supposed promiscuity spread, and she is tormented at school, where she receives no aid from the facility's apathetic counselor, who passive-aggressively blames her for the bullying she is experiencing. Michelle snaps, and begins acting and dressing provocatively, seducing Steve one day after school. Michelle has Steve drive to a secluded area, where she stabs and castrates him, then stages the scene to make it appear that he was gay, and the victim of a homophobic hate crime. Later, Michelle lures Jake to her apartment, where she ties him up (under the pretense of engaging in kinky sex) and tortures, bludgeons, and dismembers him.

The next night, Aaron hosts a Halloween party at his house, which Michelle sneaks into, dressed as Jason Voorhees. Michelle slips roofies into all of the drinks, then goes upstairs, where Aaron is cheating on Debbie with Heather. When Aaron leaves the bedroom, Michelle decapitates Heather with a machete, and takes her costume, using it to get close to Debbie, who she drowns in a filth-filled toilet. Michelle then seduces Aaron, leads him to a bedroom, confesses to murdering his friends, and kills him by biting his penis off and slitting his throat. Wendy, who has been outside, returns to the party, where everyone has passed out due to the drugs Michelle had given them. Michelle attacks Wendy, screaming, "Yeah, you tried to stop them, until you thought it might threaten your spot on the pep squad! God, you're the worst of all of them! You knew it was wrong, and you didn't do a goddamn thing to stop it!" In the struggle that ensues, Wendy stabs Michelle, who dies with the sobbing and remorseful Wendy holding her hand.

Cast 
Angelique Hennessy as Michelle Rosen
Jerad Anderson as Aaron Cussler
Danielle Noble as Wendy
Kristina Conzen as Heather
Dakota Ferreiro as Debbie Mitchell
Mark Kunzman as Jake Stife
Chris Basler as Steve
T.W. Porrill as Counselor Wiederhorn
Elizabeth Kirven as Detective Stephanie Rothman
Sean A. Mulvihill as Scott Marks
Mimi Marie as Ms. Rosen
Jennifer Holloway as Carol Johnson
Jessica Stamen as Alana Maxwell
Jeff Kueppers as Birdman
John Knapp as Baxter Wolfe
Jim Hemphill as Mean Kid on Answering Machine

Reception 

In a review for Arrow in the Head, Ammon Gilbert gave Bad Reputation a 3/4, and wrote, "For a movie with a small budget, this puppy hit hard with tension, suspense and best of all- it presented a group of characters that you actually cared about- they were all well developed, and for that I thank them. The only downside I could come up with was some pacing issues throughout (parts seemed to drag...) and the ending blew donkey balls (at least for me)". Bloody Disgusting awarded a 3/5, and concluded, "Bad Reputation is a smarter teen slasher movie but not on par with the truly dark rape/revenge films it wanted to emulate. Still for a first-time film, writer/director Hemphill doesn't 'dumb down' the story. Not a bad entry into the horror/slasher genre". The film was also praised by DW Bostaph, Jr. of Dread Central, who gave it a 3½ out 5. A 2/5 was awarded by J.R. McNamara of Digital Retribution, who criticized the poor production values, pacing problems, and awkward dialogue, opining, "I don't think that anyone should avoid this film, but don't strain yourself seeking it out either". In 2018 a special edition Blu-ray was released featuring commentary by Hemphill and film scholar Alexandra Heller-Nicholas.

References

External links 

 

American slasher films
2000s teen horror films
2000s teen drama films
Films about bullying
Halloween horror films
Homophobia in fiction
2000s English-language films
Films about mass murder
American rape and revenge films
American teen drama films
American high school films
American independent films
American teen horror films
Films about dysfunctional families
Films set in Los Angeles
Films shot in Los Angeles
American films about revenge
American exploitation films
Teensploitation
American vigilante films
2007 horror films
2007 directorial debut films
2007 drama films
2007 films
2000s American films